The X Factor Israel is the Israeli version of the British television music competition The X Factor. Season 1 was first announced in late 2012. Auditions for the show began on March 5, 2013. Promos for the show started airing in early September. The first season started its run on Saturday, October 26, 2013. The show airs during prime time on Reshet network on Wednesdays and Saturdays. The season concluded on January 14, 2014.

Judges and hosts 

In May 2013, it was announced that Bar Refaeli, an Israeli fashion model, will host the first season. Contrary to most other versions of the X Factor where the judges panels was a mixture of singers and music industry figures, the Israeli version was composed entirely of musicians. The judges panel for the first season was composed of the rock singer Rami Fortis, the pop singer-songwriter and composer Moshe Peretz, the pop and R&B singer Shiri Maimon, and the pop singer Ivri Lider.

Contestants 
Key:
 – Winner
 – Runner-up
 – Third Place

Selection process 

Auditions began on March 5, 2013. Auditions were open to all ages. Entries must pass three auditions in front of the producers in order to get to perform in front of the judges and live audience. Selected best, worst, and most bizarre auditions typically move on to the judges stage. Judging took place in Nokia Arena, Tel Aviv.

Bootcamp 
Following the judges audition stage, 80 competitors entered the boot camp stage of the X factor. Following an initial round of auditions half of the contests were eliminated. The remaining acts had to perform a second audition in order to make it to the judges houses stage. 20 acts were collaboratively selected by the judges at the end of boot camp.

Twist 
At the conclusion of bootcamp, a number of contestants from the boys category that were previously eliminated were called back into stage. The judges offered them a way back into the show as a group. The individual contestants were Edan Tamler, Adir Tov, Nadav Carni, Gustavo Quiñones, and Yuhan Buchnik. The band was eventually named Fusion.

Judges' Houses 
Five acts were chosen for each of the four categories. In the judges house, two acts from each category were eliminated. The top 12 contestants continued on for the live shows.

Key:
 – Eliminated in the judges' house

Live shows 
Live shows began on December 18, 2013.

Results summary 

Color key

Live show details

Week 1

Wednesday (December 18) 
 Group performance: "Love Me Again"

Saturday (December 21)

Week 2

Wednesday (December 25) 
Group performance: "Give Me Everything"
The contestant, Hillik Cohen, that has failed passing the live auditions and was highly aggressive toward the judges made a guest appearance and performed "אני כאן" after the group performance.

Saturday (December 28)

Week 3

Sunday (January 5) - Quarter-final 
 Group performance "הכוס הכחולה". The performance included the Carakukli Sisters and Ivri Lider.

Tuesday (January 7) - Semi-final 
 Group performance "Wake Me Up".
 The boys and Moshe Peretz performed "אולי הלילה".
 The over 25s, including those who were previously eliminated, and Shiri Maimon performed "חלק ממך" and "Now That You're Gone".

Week 4

Tuesday (January 14) - Final 
 Group performance "Scream & Shout". Performance included all the original top 15 contestants
 Judges performance "America"

Ratings 
The first episode peaked at 49%, about 1.1 million viewers, making it the highest figure for opening episode of any Israeli music program. The show had an average rating of 38.4% of households.

References

External links 
 

2013 Israeli television seasons
2014 Israeli television seasons
Israel